Osee Matson Hall (September 10, 1847 – November 26, 1914) was a U.S. Representative from Minnesota.

Born in Conneaut, Ohio, he attended the local public schools and graduated from Hiram College in Ohio and from Williams College, Williamstown, Massachusetts in 1868.

He studied law and was admitted to the bar and commenced practice in Red Wing, Minnesota. He was a member of the Minnesota Senate (1885 – 1887); elected as a Democrat to the 52nd and 53rd congresses (March 4, 1891 – March 3, 1895). He was an unsuccessful candidate for reelection in 1894 to the 54th congress.

He resumed the practice of law. Was a member of the Minnesota State Tax Commission from 1907 until his death in Saint Paul, Minnesota at age 67; interment in Oakwood Cemetery, Red Wing.

References
 Minnesota Legislators Past and Present

1847 births
1914 deaths
People from Conneaut, Ohio
Democratic Party Minnesota state senators
Hiram College alumni
Williams College alumni
Democratic Party members of the United States House of Representatives from Minnesota
19th-century American politicians